The Siti Khadijah Market is a market in Kota Bharu, Kelantan, Malaysia.

Name
The name is derived from Khadija bint Khuwaylid, the wife of Prophet Muhammad who was a businesswoman on that time. Thus, this market also is dominated by women sellers.

History
The market was originally established as Buluh Kubu Market in 1985 and opened to the public by Sultan Ismail Petra. The foundation stone of the building was laid by Tengku Razaleigh Hamzah. The market was then renamed by Kelantan Menteri Besar Nik Abdul Aziz Nik Mat in 1997.

Architecture
The market is housed in a four-story building and features an octagonal shape.

Commodities
Fresh goodies, ready-to-eat foods, local snacks and drinks can be found sold in the market.

The bottom floor is dedicated to wet items such as fish, vegetables, chicken and so on. Level 1 is allocated to dry food items such as serundeng. They additionally sell traditional Kelantan cakes, chicken, spiked fish, rice noodles, glazed rice, nasi dagang, laksam and somtam. The second and third floors are for non-food items.

See also
 List of tourist attractions in Malaysia

References

1985 establishments in Malaysia
Buildings and structures in Kelantan
Kota Bharu
Retail markets in Malaysia